Littorophiloscia is a genus of woodlice in the family Philosciidae. There are more than 20 described species in Littorophiloscia.

Species
These 25 species belong to the genus Littorophiloscia:

 Littorophiloscia albicincta (Vandel, 1973)
 Littorophiloscia aldabrana Ferrara & Taiti, 1985
 Littorophiloscia alticola (Vandel, 1977)
 Littorophiloscia amphindica Taiti & Ferrara, 1986
 Littorophiloscia bermudensis (Dahl, 1892)
 Littorophiloscia bifasciata Taiti & Ferrara, 1986
 Littorophiloscia culebrae (H. F. Moore, 1901)
 Littorophiloscia denticulata (Ferrara & Taiti, 1982)
 Littorophiloscia formosana Kwon & Jeon, 1993
 Littorophiloscia hawaiiensis Taiti & Ferrara, 1986
 Littorophiloscia insularis (Lemos de Castro & Souza, 1986)
 Littorophiloscia koreana Taiti & Ferrara, 1986
 Littorophiloscia lineata Kwon, Lee & Jeon, 1993
 Littorophiloscia nipponensis Nunomura, 1986
 Littorophiloscia normae (Van Name, 1924)
 Littorophiloscia occidentalis (Ferrara & Taiti, 1983)
 Littorophiloscia pallida Taiti & Ferrara, 1986
 Littorophiloscia richardsonae (Holmes & Gay, 1909)
 Littorophiloscia riedli (Strouhal, 1966)
 Littorophiloscia strouhali Taiti & Ferrara, 1991
 Littorophiloscia tominensis Taiti, Ferrara & Kwon, 1992
 Littorophiloscia tropicalis Taiti & Ferrara, 1986
 Littorophiloscia visayensis Kim & Kwon, 2002
 Littorophiloscia vittata (Say, 1818)
 Littorophiloscia wangi Kwon & Jeon, 1993

References

Isopoda
Articles created by Qbugbot